Río Grande de Matagalpa (Awaltara in Miskito, Ucumulalí in Matagalpa) is a river  of Nicaragua. Running  from its source near Matagalpa to the Caribbean Sea in the northern part of the South Caribbean Autonomous Region it is the second longest river in Nicaragua. It gives it name to the city and municipality of La Cruz de Río Grande. The Tumarín Dam is being constructed on its lower reaches.

References

Britannica: Rio grande de Matagalpa

Rivers of Nicaragua